Tuomas Salmela (born 30 June 1995) is a Finnish professional ice hockey player who currently plays as a defenceman for Ilves in the Liiga.

References

External links

1995 births
Living people
JYP Jyväskylä players
Finnish ice hockey defencemen
Ilves players
KOOVEE players
Sportspeople from Lapland (Finland)
People from Tornio